The Jewish Historical Institute ( or ŻIH), also known as the Emanuel Ringelblum Jewish Historical Institute, is a public cultural and research institution in Warsaw, Poland, chiefly dealing with the history of Jews in Poland and Jewish culture.

History
The Jewish Historical Institute Association is the corporate body responsible for the building and the institute's holdings. The Institute falls under the jurisdiction of the Ministry of Culture and National Heritage. In 2009 it was named after Emanuel Ringelblum and became a public cultural institution. The institute is a repository of documentary materials relating to the Jewish historical presence in Poland. It is also a centre for academic research, study and the dissemination of knowledge about the history and culture of Polish Jewry.

The most valuable part of the collection is the Warsaw Ghetto Archive, known as the Ringelblum Archive (collected by the Oyneg Shabbos). It contains some 6,000 documents (some 30,000 pages).

Other important collections concerning World War II include testimonies (mainly of Jewish survivors of the Holocaust), memoirs and diaries, documentation of the Joint and Jewish Self-Help (welfare organizations active in Poland under the occupation), and documents from the Jewish Councils (Judenräte). The section on the documentation of Jewish historical sites holds about 40 thousand photographs concerning Jewish life and culture in Poland.

The institute has published a series of documents from the Ringelblum Archive, as well as numerous wartime memoirs and diaries.

In 2021, Monika Krawczyk, a lawyer and the managing director of the Foundation for the Preservation of Jewish Heritage in the years 2004–2019, was appointed the Director of the Jewish Historical Institute by the Minister of Culture and National Heritage.

Directors
 Nachman Blumental, 1947 to 1949
 , 1949 to 1966
 Artur Eisenbach, 1966 to 1968
 Szymon Datner, 1969 to 1970
 Feliks Tych, 1995 to 2006
 Eleonora Bergman, 2007-2011
 Paweł Śpiewak, since 2011.
 , since 2021.

References

1947 establishments in Poland
Buildings and structures in Warsaw
History institutes
History organisations based in Poland
Jewish studies research institutes
Jews and Judaism in Warsaw
Research institutes established in 1947
Research institutes in Poland
Jewish organisations based in Poland